Huxley  is an English surname, originally given to people from Huxley, Cheshire. Notable people with the surname include: 

The British Huxley family: 
Thomas Henry Huxley (1825–1895), British biologist, supporter of Charles Darwin and inventor of the term 'agnosticism'
Leonard Huxley (writer) (1860–1933), British writer and editor, son of Thomas Henry
Aldous Huxley (1894–1963), British writer, son of Leonard and author of Brave New World
Sir Julian Huxley (1887–1975), British biologist and author, son of Leonard
Sir Andrew Huxley (1917–2012), British physiologist and biophysicist, son of Leonard
Elspeth Huxley (1907–1997), British writer, granddaughter-in-law of Thomas 
Sir Leonard Huxley (physicist) (1902–1988), Australian physicist, second cousin once-removed of Thomas Huxley
Anthony Julian Huxley (1920–1992), British botanist with the standard author abbreviation "Huxley"

Others
Hugh Huxley (1924–2013), British biologist, and Professor of Biology at Brandeis University
Jonathan Huxley (born 1965), British artist
Julian Huxley (rugby union) (born 1979), Australian rugby union footballer
Martin Huxley (born 1944), British mathematician
Rick Huxley (1940–2013), English musician

Fictional
 Lenina Huxley, a character in the 1993 film Demolition Man

References

English-language surnames
English toponymic surnames